Malaysia participated at the 2018 Asian Para Games which was held in Jakarta, Indonesia from 6 to 13 October 2018.

The Malaysian delegation is composed of 221 people, 126 of them are athletes which participated in 15 out of 18 events in the games (all except Goalball, Judo and Sitting Volleyball), while the rest are coaches. Lee Seng Chow serves as the head of the delegation.

Medalists
The following Malaysian competitors won medals at the Games.

Multiple medallists
The following Malaysia competitors won several medals at the 2018 Asian Para Games.

See also
 Malaysia at the 2018 Asian Games

References

External links
 Malaysian Para Contingent Report during the Asian Para Games 2018

2018
Asian Para Games
Nations at the 2018 Asian Para Games